A phosphorylation cascade is a sequence of signaling pathway events where one enzyme phosphorylates another, causing a chain reaction leading to the phosphorylation of thousands of proteins. This can be seen in signal transduction of hormone messages.

A signaling pathway begins at the cell surface where a hormone or protein binds to a receptor at the Extracellular matrix. The interactions between the molecule and receptor cause a Conformational change at the receptor, which activates multiple enzymes or proteins. These enzymes activate secondary messengers, which leads to the phosphorylation of thousands of proteins. The end product of a Phosphorylation cascade is the changes occurring inside the cell.

One best example that explains this phenomenon is mitogen-activated protein (MAP) kinase or ERK kinase. MAP kinase not only plays an important function during growth of cell in the M phase phosphorylation cascade but also plays an important role during the sequence of signaling pathway. In order to regulate its functions so it does not cause chaos, it can only be active when both tyrosine and threonine/serine residues are phosphorylated.

References

Cell biology